Luka Prašnikar (born 11 June 1987) is a Slovenian footballer who plays as a forward.

Personal life
He is a son of Bojan Prašnikar, a retired footballer and former manager of the Slovenia national football team.

References

External links
 

1987 births
Living people
People from the Municipality of Šmartno ob Paki
Slovenian footballers
Association football forwards
Slovenian expatriate footballers
Slovenian PrvaLiga players
NK Primorje players
NK Rudar Velenje players
NK Olimpija Ljubljana (2005) players
NK Nafta Lendava players
NK Šmartno 1928 players
NK Dob players
NK Aluminij players
Slovenian expatriate sportspeople in Austria
Expatriate footballers in Austria